Henry Walker Rowe (April 1, 1840 – October 9, 1913) was a private in the United States Army who was awarded the Presidential Medal of Honor for gallantry during the American Civil War. Rowe was awarded the medal on December 1, 1864 for actions performed at the Second Battle of Petersburg in Virginia on June 17, 1864.

Personal life 
Rowe was born in Candia, New Hampshire, on April 1, 1840, the son of John and Lydia Rowe. He married Sophronia J. Wallace and, later, Lavinia T. Rowe. After the war, he worked as a printer in Manchester, New Hampshire, and eventually moved his business to Dayton, Ohio, and Boston, Massachusetts. He fathered one son with his second wife in 1874. He died in Roxbury, Massachusetts, on October 9, 1913, from hypostatic pneumonia and was buried in Hill Cemetery in Candia.

Military service 
Rowe enlisted in the Army on August 14, 1862, and was mustered into Company I of the 11th New Hampshire Infantry on September 2, 1862. On June 15, 1864, while on the front lines at the Battle of Petersburg, the 11th was ordered to run through a ravine and break the Confederate lines. After a 24 hour march and an initial failed attack at 6 PM, an ambush at 3 AM overran Confederate lines and allowed Rowe and two other men to capture 27 Confederates manning a battery and their flags.

Rowe's Medal of Honor citation reads:

Rowe was wounded in the shoulder during a mine explosion at Petersburg on June 30, 1864, and was moved to Douglas Hospital in Washington D.C. before being mustered out of service on June 14, 1865.

References 

1840 births
1913 deaths
Union Army soldiers
People from Candia, New Hampshire
United States Army Medal of Honor recipients
American Civil War recipients of the Medal of Honor
Deaths from pneumonia in Massachusetts